The Saale glaciation or Saale Glaciation, sometimes referred to as the Saalian glaciation, Saale cold period, Saale complex (Saale-Komplex) or Saale glacial stage (Saale-Glazial, colloquially also the Saale-Eiszeit or Saale-Zeit), covers the middle of the three large glaciations in Northern Europe and the northern parts of Eastern, Central and Western Europe by the Scandinavian Inland Ice Sheet between the older Elster glaciation and the younger Weichselian glaciation, also called the Last Glacial Period.

Age and definitions 

It succeeded the Holstein interglacial and was followed by the Eemian interglacial. The Saale complex is currently estimated, depending on the source, as existing from around 300,000 to 130,000 years ago or 347,000 to 128,000 years ago (duration: around 219,000 years), roughly contemporaneous with the glaciation of the Riss Glacial in the Alpine region. The actual "ice age" includes only part of the Saale glaciation or Saale complex. The first cold phase (Fuhne glacial) at the start of the Saale complexes is separated by a warmer period (Dömnitz interglacial) from the actual Saale "ice age". The term "Saale Ice Age" or "Saale Glacial" thus has 2 meanings in the literature – it sometimes refers to the phase in which the glacier advanced into North Germany, but can also refer to the whole Saale complex. The terms are frequently interchanged in the literature.

The Saale Glaciation occurred at around the same time as the Wolstonian Stage in the British Isles and the Illinoian Stage in North America.

In 1910, the name for "Saale glaciation" was given by German geologists Jacob Stoller and Konrad Keilhack.

Extent 
The maximum advance of the ice sheet in North Germany during the Drenthe Stage is described by a line from Düsseldorf via Paderborn, Hamelin, Goslar, Eisleben, Zeitz and Meissen to Görlitz. From the eastern edge of the Harz eastwards (Poland, Brandenburg, Saxony and Saxony-Anhalt) the ice advanced to about 10 to 50 km behind the maximum extent of the Elster glaciation. On the northern edge of the Harz the two ice sheets reached the same line; and west of the Harz the ice of the Saale complex extended over 100 km further south than the ice sheet of the Elster. In front of this line, i.e. in front of the former glaciers, fluviatile and periglacial sediments are widespread. In the Drenthe Stage the present day North Sea basin, Great Britain and Ireland were also affected.

Several species were hurt by the glaciation, including the woolly mammoths, which suffered a reduction comparable to the one towards the end of the ice age.

Sequence and subdivisions 
The Saale complex may be divided into a lower (also Saale Early Glacial) and an upper section (also Middle and Upper Saale Glacial, or Younger Saale glaciation), with glacial advances into Northern Germany.

The Saale Early Glacial includes the:
 Dömnitz interglacial, which was characterised by oak mixed forest, hazel and hornbeam. Worth mentioning is the discovery of Water Fern (Azolla filiculoides). 
 Fuhne glacial. After the end of the Holstein interglacial, the forests of North Germany died and a sub-arctic vegetation formed.

The upper part of the Saale complex (obere Teil des Saale-Komplexes) is characterised in North Germany by three great glacial advances (possibly even four in  Schleswig-Holstein). They are usually called the:
 Warthe Stage or Stadium (Warthe-Stadium)
 Drenthe Stage or Stadium (Drenthe-Stadium)
 Drenthe II Phase (Jüngere Drenthe)
 Drenthe I Phase (Haupt-Drenthe)

There are no indisputable traces in northern Germany of clear thermomers (interstadials, intervals) between these advances.
In the work by Litt et al. (2007) focussed on the southern perimeter of the North German glaciations, the upper part of the Saale complex is subdivided as follows:
 Warthe Stage (Warthe-Stadium)
 Seyda Interval (Seyda-Intervall)
 Drenthe Stage (Drenthe-Stadium)
 Leipzig Phase (Leipzig-Phase)
 Pomßen Interval (Pomßen-Intervall)
 Zeitz Phase (Zeitz-Phase)
 (Delitzsch Phase (Delitzsch-Phase))

The Drenthe Stage corresponds to the maximum extent of glaciation during the Saale complex. During the last stage, the Warthe Stage, glaciers only covered northeast Lower Saxony (parts of the Lüneburg Heath), the Altmark, the Elbe valley downstream of Magdeburg and the region east of it (c.f. Südlicher Landrücken), so that these areas are  geomorphologically younger than the Northwest German Plain, but older and exhibiting more surface weathering than the much later Young Drift areas of the Weichselian glaciation in northeast Germany. The areas last covered by the Saale cold period, roughly the Westphalian Bight, a large part of Lower Saxony and Saxony-Anhalt, south Brandenburg, or the Leipzig Bay and Lusatia in Saxony, are called the Old Drift Landscapes (Altmoränenlandschaften). They were further shaped and changed during the later Weichselian cold period by periglacial processes such as wind-borne sand and loess. The major urstromtal associated with the 
Saale glacial stage is the Breslau-Magdeburg-Bremen Urstromtal, which was not subsequently covered by ice.

See also 
 Pleistocene, which covers:

References

Footnotes

Literature 
 Thomas Litt, Karl-Ernst Behre, Klaus-Dieter Meyer, Hans-Jürgen Stephan und Stefan Wansa: Stratigraphische Begriffe für das Quartär des norddeutschen Vereisungsgebietes. Eiszeitalter und Gegenwart (Quaternary Science Journal), 56(1/2): 7–65, Hanover, 2007.  
 Leopold Benda (ed.): Das Quartär Deutschlands. 408 pp., Borntraeger, Berlin, Stuttgart, 1995 

Pleistocene events
Ice ages